Garnova is a rural locality (a village) in Vsevolodo-Vilvenskoye Urban Settlement, Alexandrovsky District, Perm Krai, Russia. The population was 8 as of 2010. There is 1 street.

Geography 
Garnova is located 36 km west of Alexandrovsk (the district's administrative centre) by road. Shumkovo is the nearest rural locality.

References 

Rural localities in Alexandrovsky District